Ormandy is a surname. Notable people with the surname include:

Eugene Ormandy (1899–1985), Hungarian-American conductor and violinist
Jack Ormandy (born 1912), British footballer 
Neil Ormandy (born 1981), British musician, songwriter and producer 
Tavis Ormandy, British computer programmer